The following is a list of presidents of the International Ski Federation (FIS), the world skiing governing body.

References 

 
Skiing-related lists